Antônio Peregrino Maciel Monteiro, 2nd Baron of Itamaracá (April 30, 1804 – January 5, 1868) was a Brazilian poet, orator, diplomat, politician, physician and journalist. He is the patron of the 27th chair of the Brazilian Academy of Letters, patron of the 7th chair of the Pernambucan Academy of Letters, and of the 23rd chair of the National Academy of Medicine.

Life
Monteiro was born in Recife, Pernambuco, to Manuel Francisco Maciel Monteiro (who was the brother of the previous Baron of Itamaracá, Tomás Antônio Maciel Monteiro) and Manuela Lins de Melo. After making preparatory studies in Olinda, he went to France in 1823, where he graduated in Medicine, Science and Letters at the University of Paris. In 1829, he returns to Recife, where he becomes a doctor for a short time — he would abandon his medical career to become a politician.

He was a provincial deputy in 1833 and a general deputy from 1834 to 1844, and again from 1850 to 1853. He was also the minister of Foreign Affairs from 1837 to 1839, and the headmaster of the Faculdade de Direito de Olinda from 1839 to 1844. As a journalist, he worked for journals O Lidador, A Carranca and A União. In 1853, following his diplomatic career, he went to Lisbon, where his diplomatic acting would give him the title of second Baron of Itamaracá, in a post that would last until his death, in 1868. His remains were brought to Pernambuco in 1870, and, in 1872, he was buried at a mausoleum built for him, in the bairro of Santo Amaro, in Recife.

Works
Monteiro's poems were published posthumously, in 1905, under the name Poesias (Poetry).

External links
 Monteiro's biography, Brazilian Academy of Letters 
 Poems by Monteiro, Brazilian Academy of Letters 

1804 births
1868 deaths
19th-century Brazilian poets
Brazilian medical writers
Brazilian journalists
Politicians from Recife
People from Recife
People from Pernambuco
Romantic poets
University of Paris alumni
Portuguese-language writers
Patrons of the Brazilian Academy of Letters
Brazilian nobility
Brazilian male poets
Foreign ministers of Brazil
Members of the Chamber of Deputies (Empire of Brazil)
Presidents of the Chamber of Deputies (Brazil)
19th-century journalists
Male journalists
19th-century Brazilian male writers